Charles Soong Yocklunn (1871–1939) was born in Canton, China, and lived in Victoria and in Toodyay, Western Australia.

Early life
Charles Soong Yocklunn was born in Canton, China, in 1871, and came to Western Australia with his wife Wee Shin, and his father Soong On in the late 1890s. The family lived in Northam before moving to Toodyay in 1913.

Family
The Yocklunns (also spelt Yock Lunn) were a highly regarded family of Chinese market gardeners in Toodyay during the early decades of the 20th century. Charles Soong Yocklunn was also well respected by Perth's Chinese community. He was known to have stood in for the Chinese Consul General, Soong Fat San, when he was absent from Australia. Yocklunn's children John and Moya achieved academically while the first born, John Yocklunn (Soong Chung), went on to have a distinguished career as a government advisor in Australia and Papua New Guinea earning him the title Sir John Yocklunn KCVO in 1977.

Early years in Northam and Toodyay
Apparently in common with many others during the 1890s they came to Western Australia to make their fortune from the gold boom, but turned to farming instead. Yocklunn first farmed on land that he leased at "Nardie" in Toodyay then, in 1913, he moved the family to Coondle in the Toodyay Valley after acquiring  of land from Dave Lloyd. The Toodyay Valley had been recognised as prime agricultural and pasturing country when Ensign Dale's exploration party came across the valley in 1831. The valley is known for its permanent springs that feed into the Toodyay Brook. By 1836 a number of land grants had been acquired along the length of the Valley.
Yocklunn called his property ‘Evergreen Garden Orchard' and located his home and market garden near the Toodyay Brook. Irrigation schemes using the waters from the Avon River and Toodyay Brook were set up by the farmers resulting in the district becoming an important producer of fruit and vegetables for markets at home and abroad. In relation to the latter, there were shipments of oranges from major Toodyay properties being sent to the London market after grading by the Agricultural Department.
It may have been in the early days when he was establishing his market garden that Yocklunn went with his horse and cart to hawk his produce around the district. "In time he acquired Donegan's store and set up a vegetable shop in town. He used to send cabbages and cauliflowers to Kalgoorlie by the trainload when a line was built up the Toodyay Valley, and the siding by his home was called Lunn's Landing." One local recalls the landing. "The Railway established a point there for him to load his produce … it consisted merely of some 44 gallon drums with a platform built on top of it so he could load his produce on to that and from there transfer it to the train when it pulled up on the main line."

Agricultural show successes
Yocklunn exhibited his produce at the annual Toodyay Agricultural Show, winning awards for his vegetables, and citrus fruit. In 1918 he won prizes for his potatoes, brown onions, turnips, carrots, lettuce and beans. At the 1927 show, it was reported the judge was so impressed with the exhibits in the vegetable section that he commented "they were better than those seen at the Royal Show." In 1928 he also exhibited a selection of citrus fruits, navel oranges, lemons and mandarins. "A pleasing array of fruit from local orchards was on view, qualified judges being greatly impressed with the size and appearance, whilst the vegetables also evoked considerable praise." 
The family's plan was to make enough money to buy a hotel back home in China. It was hard work and in 1929 a niece Lucy See Su came out to help in the house and market garden. Lucy was still of school age and attended the Sisters of Mercy Convent in Toodyay. She was one of the children that came into town from the outlying districts on the school bus (a charabanc). She was fortunate not to be injured in the tragic accident that took place in August 1931 when the bus collided with a wheat train at the Clinton Street crossing. Five local schoolboys were killed and twelve children were injured.

The Toodyay Brook was subject to flooding and one year the Yocklunn's house was inundated. A local recalls how "poor Mrs Yok's house got really flooded with mud and slush and trees and what-have-you. All the local lads around the town went out and helped clean the house out and shovel the mud out of the house, and cleaned up the house."

Family moves and deaths
In 1932 the family went back to Canton leaving Soong On to manage Evergreen Garden Orchard. A son Soong Chung Yocklunn was born there in 1933. In 1934 Yocklunn returned to Toodyay to organise the selling of the property with the idea of returning to China with his father. Before this could happen Soong On died in December 1936.

During this time a daughter Soong Moy was born in Canton. Yocklunn never saw his daughter as he died in December 1939 at the relatively young age of 54 years. His obituary states he "was widely known and esteemed throughout the Toodyay district." Both Yocklunn and his father were buried in the Anglican section of the Toodyay Cemetery.

The Second World War and the threat of Japan's entry into the conflict saw the remaining Yocklunn family flee from China before the Japanese invasion. Mrs Wee Shin Yocklunn returned to Toodyay with the children before moving to Northam. A 1944 newspaper article about raising funds for the restoration of the roof of St Stephen's Anglican Church in Toodyay lists contributions made by the children, with an anonymous donation, very possibly by Mrs Yocklunn.

References

People from Toodyay, Western Australia
Australian people of Chinese descent
1871 births
1939 deaths
Date of birth missing
Date of death missing